Martha Ellen Young Truman (November 25, 1852 – July 26, 1947) was the mother of U.S. president Harry Truman, the paternal grandmother of Margaret Truman, and the mother-in-law of Bess Truman.

Biography

Martha Ellen Young was born in Jackson County, Missouri, on November 25, 1852, to Solomon Young, a successful farmer who also had a business running Conestoga wagon trains along the Overland Trail, and his wife Harriet Louisa Gregg. In the American Civil War, the family were southern sympathizers and several relatives served in the Confederate Army. In later life, Martha told of how a band of Union-supporting Jayhawkers destroyed her family's farm one day in 1861, then came again in 1863 when the family was forced to evacuate by General Order 11 and required to move to Platte County, Missouri until after the war.  This harsh treatment left Martha with a lifelong resentment for the winning Union side in the war. She was well-known for her Confederate sympathies (a story made the rounds that when she first visited the White House in 1945, she refused to sleep in the Lincoln Bedroom, but her family denied this account).

Martha attended the Baptist College for Women in Lexington.  She married John Anderson Truman on December 28, 1881 in Grandview, Missouri.  Their first son died just a few days after birth. Their second child, another son, was Harry S Truman, born on May 8, 1884. Two more children followed: John Vivian Truman on April 25, 1886 (who became a district director of the Federal Housing Administration in western Missouri), and Mary Jane Truman on August 12, 1889 (who was a pianist and schoolteacher). All three children worked on the family farm in Grandview.
After her husband John Truman died in 1914, Martha took over the farm and ran it with the labor of her children and various hired helpers until the 1930s, when her age and increasing frailty made it impossible. At the time of her son's selection as vice presidential nominee in 1944, Martha Truman told the press that Truman had not wanted the position and that she would have rather seen him stay in the Senate.

On April 12, 1945, President Roosevelt died and Harry Truman was sworn in as president. Martha Truman was often quoted, sometimes colorfully, in the press.  She made her first trip to Washington soon after Harry became president. Seeing the crowd of press that arrived to cover her visit, she said, "Oh fiddlesticks! If I'd known that, I wouldn't have come." Her comments were widely reported and were said to have "captured the nation's fancy".

She lived to see two years of her son's presidency before her death on July 26, 1947, aged 94.

References

Further reading
Bonnie Angelo, "Be a Good Boy, Harry", in First Mothers: The Women Who Shaped the Presidents (HarperCollins, 2001), pp. 40–73.  Excerpts available at Google Books.

External links
 Martha Young "Mattie" Ellen Young Truman, Find a Grave

1852 births
1947 deaths
Housewives
Missouri Democrats
Mothers of presidents of the United States
Mothers of vice presidents of the United States
People from Jackson County, Missouri
Southern Baptists
Truman family
People from Grandview, Missouri